The 1988 United States election in Tennessee was held on November 8, 1988. Incumbent Democratic U.S. Senator Jim Sasser won re-election to a third term.

Major candidates

Democratic 
 Jim Sasser, incumbent U.S. Senator since 1977

Republican 
 Bill Anderson, attorney

Results

See also 
 1988 United States Senate elections

References 

United States Senate
Tennessee
1988